Dromiops nanniscus is a species of beetle in the family Carabidae, and is the only species found in the genus Dromiops.

References

Lebiinae